First Eastern Counties is a bus operator providing services in Norfolk and Suffolk in eastern England. It is a subsidiary of FirstGroup.

It has seven depots which are part of five operating areas spread out across East Anglia. The five operating areas are Norwich, Ipswich, Great Yarmouth, Lowestoft and King's Lynn.

History

In July 1931 the Eastern Counties Omnibus Company was formed. It was a combination of the four existing bus companies in East Anglia. Eastern Counties Road Car Company of Ipswich, Ortona Motor Company of Cambridge and Peterborough Electric Traction Company all owned by Tilling & British Automobile Traction and United Automobile Services' East Anglia services and commenced with 534 buses.

Upon completion the major shareholders were United Automobile Services (43%), Tilling & British Automobile Traction (28%), London & North Eastern Railway (24%) and London Midland & Scottish Railway (3%). Also included was the Eastern Coach Works in Lowestoft. By the end of the 1930s the Eastern Counties Omnibus Company purchased another 50 operators.

In September 1942 Tilling & British Automobile Traction was placed in administration and its Eastern Counties Omnibus Company shareholding transferred to Tilling Group. In November 1948 it was nationalised and placed under the control of the British Transport Commission and in January 1969 became part of the National Bus Company.

In preparation for bus deregulation, in September 1984 the company's operations in Cambridgeshire were transferred to a separate company, Cambus Limited. The company's coaching operations were also transferred to Ambassador Travel, Great Yarmouth.

In February 1987 the company was privatised in a management buyout. In July 1994 it was sold to the GRT Group who in June 1995 merged with Badgerline to form FirstBus.  In September 1996 the Great Yarmouth Transport business was purchased.

In April 2011 the King's Lynn based services were sold to Norfolk Green.

Divisions
First operates out of five main depots. Each division provides services to the area around its depot.

Network Norwich

First Eastern Counties operates services branded as the Network Norwich within the city centre of Norwich and to towns and villages within approximately a  radius. Their fleet consists of Volvo B7TL and Dennis Trident 2 double deck buses with Plaxton President bodies, Volvo B9TL double deckers with Wright Eclipse Gemini bodies, some new Wright StreetDecks, Wrightbus Streetlites, and Volvo B7L and Volvo B7RLE single deckers with Wright Eclipse bodywork.

On 23 September 2012, First Norwich relaunched its bus network with new colour branding for its routes. Most buses in the fleet have now been painted in a colour at the front to reflect the line that they work.

On 22 March 2017, First announced that they are to introduce a direct bus service between Norwich and Bungay in Suffolk. The new service will be numbered X41 and will be part of the Charcoal colour line, alongside service 40 to Poringland, which the new service will also call at.

First Great Yarmouth

First Great Yarmouth operates services within the towns of Great Yarmouth and Gorleston as well as dedicated routes to Norwich and Lowestoft (CoastLink). The Great Yarmouth services operate out of the old Blue Bus depot on Caister Road which still retains its original frontage and is a listed building which dates back to the mid 1900s.

The fleet consists of Alexander Dennis Enviro 400s that work the CoastLink services, Volvo B7TL deckers with Plaxton President bodies accompanied by some Alexander ALX400 examples and Wright Eclipse Geminis, both on Volvo's B7TL chassis and the 2008 B9TL versions which work the Coastal Clipper services, The 2009 B9TL version and The 2012 B9TL Versions.  Single deckers in the fleet, like Norwich, are Wright StreetLites.

First Great Yarmouth also operates 6 open-top buses. One is a Plaxton President-bodied Dennis Trident painted in the Coastal Clipper Cabriolet livery,3 Semi Open top Wright Eclipse Gemini-bodied Volvo B7TLS in Coastal Clipper Cabriolet livery and a Fully 
open Top Wright Eclipse Gemini-bodied Volvo B7TL in Coastal Clipper Cabriolet livery

First Lowestoft
First Lowestoft operates services within the town of Lowestoft as well as dedicated routes to Great Yarmouth, Beccles and Norwich. The Lowestoft services operate out of Britain's most easterly bus depot, situated on Gordon Road, just a few hundred meters away from Ness Point.

The double deck fleet consists of Volvo B7TLs with Alexander ALX400 bodies and Volvo B9TLs with Wright Eclipse-Gemini bodywork. The single deck fleet is made up of Dennis Dart SLF Alexander Pointer 2s and Alexander Dennis Enviro200s.

First Ipswich

The Ipswich services operate out of one depot situated on Star Lane, just a few minutes walk from the Old cattle market bus station.

Their double deck fleet only consists of Volvo B7TL Alexander ALX400 and Wright StreetDeck due to the height of their garage. Their single deck fleet is slightly more varied though with a couple of Alexander Dennis Enviro200s, Alexander Dennis Enviro300 ,some Volvo B7RLE Wright Eclipse Urban and some Volvo B7RLE Wright Eclipse 2. Having operated Ipswich's park & ride service from 2008 until November 2013, in July 2017 First Ipswich resumed operating the service.In 2019, First rebranded their Ipswich operation to 'Ipswich Reds' and introduced a new red livery for Ipswich's services.

Excel

A number of services are operated under the Excel brand, most notably the excel itself between Peterborough, King's Lynn and Norwich and the X1 between Norwich, Great Yarmouth and Lowestoft. Prior to July 2014, the excel and X1 operated as a single service straight through from Peterborough to Lowestoft,  end-to-end. The excel is operated by King's Lynn outstation - the only service operated by here - whilst Great Yarmouth and Lowestoft depots operate the X1 and related services, branded as CoastLink, all using 2013 Alexander Dennis Enviro400s with older Wright Eclipse Gemini-bodied Volvo B9TLs as spares.

Heritage Buses
First Eastern Counties celebrate their heritage with three specially liveried Volvo B7TL  and one Volvo B9TL buses. Those at Great Yarmouth and Lowestoft commemorate the former municipal operators in each town, while the one usually based at Ipswich carries the Eastern Counties post-National Bus Company scheme of Post Office Red with orange and cream bands.

Another three vehicles, this time two Volvo B7Ls and a B7RLE on Wright Eclipse bodywork were all painted in variations of the post-National Bus Company scheme. All three of these vehicles operate in Norwich.

Coastlink services

First Eastern Counties currently provide a number of Coastlink branded feeder routes at the eastern end of the main Excel service, operated using the ADL Enviro400s formerly used on the core route. Prior to February 2018, the Excel ran all the way from Peterborough to Lowestoft. Coastlink services replaced the Excel between Norwich and Lowestoft after this time.

The X2 operates between Norwich bus station and Lowestoft bus station, as with the X1; however, it stops more frequently and is routed via Gillingham, Beccles, Worlingham and Carlton Colville rather than via Acle and Great Yarmouth as with the X1. The X2 operates every 30 minutes from Monday to Saturday daytimes. Minor variations of the route of the X2, known as the X21 and X22, operate somewhat more infrequently to serve surrounding villages along the route of the X2, including North Cove and Whitton; the X21 three journeys in the morning peak and five in the evening peak, while the X22 runs every hour from Monday to Saturday daytimes.

The X11 operates as a variation of the X1, shadowing the route of the X1 between Norwich and Gorleston-on-Sea via Great Yarmouth, before diverging at James Paget University Hospital to serve and terminate in Belton rather than continuing onwards to Lowestoft. The X11 operates every 30 minutes from Monday to Saturday daytimes.

References

External links
Company website

Bus operators in Norfolk
Bus operators in Suffolk
FirstGroup bus operators in England
Former nationalised industries of the United Kingdom
Transport companies established in 1931
1931 establishments in England